Yuvika Chaudhary (born 2 August 1983) is an Indian actress who has appeared in Bollywood films such as Om Shanti Om, Summer 2007 and Toh Baat Pakki!. In 2009, she also acted in a Kannada movie, Maleyali Jotheyali, in a lead role opposite Ganesh. In 2015, she was a contestant in Colors TV's reality show Bigg Boss 9. In 2019, she participated in the dance reality show Nach Baliye 9 with her husband Prince Narula and emerged as the winner.

Early life
Chaudhary was born on 2 August 1983. She hails from Baraut in Uttar Pradesh. Her father worked in the Department of Education.

Career

Chaudhary participated in Zee Cine Stars Ki Khoj in 2004. This led to an acting assignment for the popular TV serial Astitva...Ek Prem Kahani, in which she played Aastha. In 2006, she also appeared in Himesh Reshammiya's Music Video for the song "Wada Tainu" from the album Aap Kaa Surroor. She also appeared in a Coca-Cola advertisement opposite Kunal Kapoor. Farah Khan took notice of her and gave her a Bollywood break in Om Shanti Om (2007).

She later did films like Summer 2007 and Toh Baat Pakki. In 2011, she appeared in Naughty @ 40, her first role as a lead actress opposite Govinda, and in Khap opposite Manoj Pahwa. In Enemmy (2013), she acted opposite Kay Kay Menon.

Her most recent releases are The Shaukeens, Afra Tafri and Yaarana. She was also a part of Punjabi film Yaaran Da Katchup (2014).

Chaudhary made her comeback to television with Life OK's show Dafa 420 but was later replaced by Madhurima Tuli. In 2015, she took part in the reality TV show Bigg Boss 9. In 2018, she was seen in Zee TV's Kumkum Bhagya as Tina. She was also seen in an episode of Laal Ishq as Shikha opposite Prince Narula.

Personal life

Chaudhari dated actor Vipul Roy for ten years. Chaudhary met Prince Narula during Bigg Boss 9. He proposed to her on 14 February 2018 and they got engaged. They were married on 12 October 2018 in Mumbai.

Filmography

Films

Television

Web series

Music videos

References

External links

 
 
 

1983 births
Living people
Indian film actresses
Bigg Boss (Hindi TV series) contestants
Fear Factor: Khatron Ke Khiladi participants
People from Baraut